This is a list of places of interest in the county of Norfolk, England. See List of places in Norfolk for a list of settlements in the county.

Places of interest

Gardens
Fairhaven Woodland and Water Garden 
Gooderstone Water Gardens
Priory Maze

Areas of interest
The Norfolk Broads – part of The Broads National Park
North Norfolk Heritage Coast
Sheringham Park – National Trust

Nature reserves
Norfolk Wildlife Trust
National Nature Reserves in Norfolk
RSPB nature reserves (Royal Society for the Protection of Birds): 
Berney Marshes, Breydon Water, Halvergate Marshes, Snettisham, Strumpshaw Fen, Titchwell Marsh

Houses, castles and churches
Blickling Hall, Felbrigg Hall, Oxburgh Hall – National Trust
Walsingham Abbey and Shrine
Wymondham Abbey (see also Historic houses in England)
Castle Acre Priory
Holkham Hall

Footpaths
Long distance footpaths:
Angles Way, Fen Rivers Way, Nar Valley Way, North Norfolk Coastal Path, Peddars Way, Weavers Way
Other footpaths:
Bure Valley Path, Great Eastern Pingo Trail, Marriott's Way, Paston Way, Tas Valley Way

Heritage sites
Heritage railways:
Bressingham Steam Museum, Bure Valley Railway, Mid-Norfolk Railway, East Anglian Railway Museum, North Norfolk Railway
Norwich Castle Museum
Norfolk Windmills Trust
Norfolk wherry – a black-sailed trader
City of Norwich Aviation Museum

 
Norfolk